The Diocese of Guiratinga (Dioecesis Guiratingensis) was a former ecclesiastical circumscription of the Catholic Church in Brazil, belonging to the Ecclesiastical Province of Cuiabá and the West II Regional Bishops' Council of the National Conference of Bishops of Brazil, being a suffragan of the Archdiocese of Cuiabá. The episcopal see is the Cathedral St. John the Baptist in the city of Guiratinga in the state of Mato Grosso.

The Prelature Registry Araguaia (Territorialis Praelatura Registrensis or Territorialis Praelatura registration Araguaia) was erected on May 12, 1914 by Pope Pius X, by decree of the Sacred Congregation Concistorial [1], from territory taken from the Archdiocese Cuiabá, and delivered by the Holy See to the care of the Salesians.
1st Bishop Prelate: Don Antonio Malan - SDB - (1914-1924)
Apostolic Administrator: Mons. Conturon John the Baptist (1924 - 1937)
2nd Bishop Prelate: Bishop Jose Selva - SDB (1937-1956)
3rd Bishop Prelate: Don Camillo Faresin - SDB (1956-1969)
Pope Paul VI, on May 27, 1969, changed the name to Prelature of Guiratinga (Territorialis Praelatura Guiratingensis). On October 3, 1981, it was promoted to the rank of diocese by Pope John Paul II.

History
 May 12, 1914: Established as Territorial Prelature of Registro do Araguaia from the Metropolitan Archdiocese of Cuiabá
 June 15, 1957: Lost territory to establish Diocese of Campo Grande
 May 13, 1969: Lost territory to establish Territorial Prelature of São Félix
 May 27, 1969: Renamed as Territorial Prelature of Guiratinga
 October 3, 1981: Promoted as Diocese of Guiratinga
 February 27, 1982: Lost territory to establish Diocese of Barra do Garças
 June 25, 2014: Suppressed to the Diocese of Rondonopolis (renamed Rondonopolis - Guiratinga), Diocese of Paranatinga (renamed Primavera do Leste – Parataninga), and Diocese of Barra do Garças

Leadership
 Bishops of Guiratinga (Roman rite)
 Bishop Derek John Christopher Byrne, S.P.S. (2008.12.24 – 2014.06.25)
 Bishop Sebastião Assis de Figueiredo, O.F.M. (2001.08.29 – 2007.12.20)
 Bishop José Foralosso, S.D.B. (1991.11.20 – 2000.01.12)
 Bishop Camillo Faresin, S.D.B. (1981.10.03 – 1991.11.20)
 Prelates of Guiratinga (Roman Rite) 
 Bishop Camillo Faresin, S.D.B. (1969.05.27 – 1981.10.03)
 Prelates of Registro do Araguaia (Roman Rite) 
 Bishop Camillo Faresin, S.D.B. (1956.09.14 – 1969.05.27)
 Bishop José Selva, S.D.B. (1937.12.27 – 1956.08.13)
 Fr. João Batista Conturon, S.D.B. (Apostolic Administrator 1925.07.21 – 1937)
 Bishop Antônio Malan, S.D.B. (1914.05.25 – 1924.01.03)

References

External links
 GCatholic.org 
 Catholic Hierarchy

Former Roman Catholic dioceses in America
Christian organizations established in 1914
Guiratinga, Roman Catholic Diocese of
Roman Catholic dioceses and prelatures established in the 20th century